Tverskaya Street, known between 1935 and 1990 as Gorky Street, is the main radial street in Moscow. The street runs Northwest from the central Manege Square in the direction of Saint Petersburg and terminates at the Garden Ring, giving the name to Tverskoy District. The route continues further as First Tverskaya-Yamskaya Street, Leningradsky Avenue and Leningradskoye Highway.

History and architecture

Middle Ages to 18th century

Tourists are told that Tverskaya Street existed as early as the 12th century. Its importance for the medieval city was immense, as it connected Moscow with its superior, and later chief rival, Tver. At that time, the thoroughfare crossed the Neglinnaya River. The first stone bridge across the Neglinnaya was set up in 1595.

In the 17th and 18th centuries, Tverskaya Street was renowned as the centre of Moscow's social life. The nobility considered it fashionable to settle in this district. Among the Palladian mansions dating from the reign of Catherine the Great are the residence of the mayor of Moscow (1778–82, rebuilt in ), and the English Club (1780s). The mayor's residence among a number of other historic buildings was moved about 14 meters for the widening of the Gorky Street during Stalin's time. On the square before it stands a statue of the legendary founder of Moscow, Yuri Dolgoruky, erected for the city's 800th anniversary.

During the imperial period, the importance of the thoroughfare was highlighted by the fact that it was through this street that the tsars arrived from the Northern capital to stay at their Kremlin residence. Several triumphal arches were constructed to commemorate coronation ceremonies. In 1792, the Tverskaya Square was laid out before the residence of the governor of Moscow as a staging ground for mass processions and parades. In 1947, the square was decorated with an equestrian statue of Prince Yury Dolgoruky, founder of Moscow.

19th century

During Pushkin's time, the Tverskaya was lined with five churches. The poet wove his impressions from the street into the following stanza of Eugene Onegin:

Towards the end of the 19th century, the street was reconstructed, with stately neoclassical mansions giving way to grandiose commercial buildings in an eclectic mixture of historical styles. A characteristic edifice of the time is the eclectic Hotel National, Moscow (1901-1903), whose interior is a landmark of Russian Art Nouveau. In 1888 the actor, theatre director and founder of the Moscow Art Theatre, Constantin Stanislavski, rented the Ginzburg House on the street and had it converted into a luxurious clubhouse with its own large stage and several exhibition rooms, in order to house his newly formed Society of Art and Literature. The Society gave its last performance there on 3 January 1891 and the building burnt down on the night of January 10.

Modern history

Between the Russian Revolution of 1917 and the rise of Stalinist architecture in mid-1930s, the street acquired three modernist buildings - constructivist Izvestia Building by Grigory Barkhin (1925–1927, Pushkin Square), Central Telegraph Building (1927-29, 7 Tverskaya), a modernist masterpiece by Ivan Rerberg, and a stern "black cube" of the Lenin Institute in Tverskaya Square (1926) by Stepan Chernyshyov.  The street was renamed in 1932 for Maxim Gorky, the Russian writer and revolutionary admired by both Vladimir Lenin and Josef Stalin.

Further expansion occurred in line with Joseph Stalin's 1935 master plan. During that period, all the churches and most other historic buildings were torn down in order to widen the street and replace low-rise buildings with larger, early Stalinist apartment blocks and government offices. Arkady Mordvinov, who handled this ambitious project, retained some historical buildings, like the ornately decorated Savvinskoye Podvorye by Ivan Kuznetsov. This building was moved to a new foundation North from the new street line, and is now completely enclosed inside Mordvinov's Stalinist block at 6, Tverskaya Street.

The project was only partially completed before World War II; more Stalinist blocks appeared in the 1940s and 1950s, still leaving a lot of 19th-century buildings. Most of them were torn down later, with a few exceptions like Yermolova Theatre still standing. Hotel Intourist, a 22-story tower built in 1970, was demolished in 2002 and replaced by the Ritz-Carlton Hotel Moscow.

When Soviet President Mikhail Gorbachev assumed power, he encouraged a return to the country's old Russian names.  Thus, the street's name became "Tverskaya Street" again, after a 55-year interlude as Gorky Street.

Layout and functions 

Tverskaya Street runs from the Manege Square through the Tverskoy District and the crossing with the Boulevard Ring, known as Pushkin Square, to the Garden Ring. Its extension, First Tverskaya-Yamskaya Street, continues further on Northwest right up to Belorussky Rail Terminal (Tverskaya Zastava Square), changing its name again into Leningradsky Prospekt. It keeps the same direction before diverging into Volokolamskoye Shosse and Leningradskoye Shosse (Leningrad Highway).

Tverskaya Street is the most expensive shopping street in Moscow and Russia. According to an index published by global real estate company Colliers International in 2008, it is now the third most expensive street in the world, based on commercial rental fees. It is the center of the city's nightlife and entertainment.

Reconstruction plan, 2007-2009 

Plans for the reconstruction of the Tverskaya radius into a grade-separated freeway, already under way in remote parts of the route (see Leningradsky Prospekt Reconstruction for a complete schedule), have been authorized for Tverskaya Zastava and Pushkin Square in April, 2007, to be completed in 2009. Work is already underway at the first location. Both squares will acquire complex multi-level, grade-separated crossings and underground shopping malls, despite objections from preservationists and traffic experts.

See also

 List of upscale shopping districts

References

Sources
 Benedetti, Jean. 1999. Stanislavski: His Life and Art. Revised edition. Original edition published in 1988. London: Methuen. .

Streets in Moscow
Tourist attractions in Moscow
Shopping districts and streets in Russia
Tverskoy District
Maxim Gorky